Krishna Baldev Vaid  (27 July 1927 – 6 February 2020) was an Indian Hindi fiction writer and playwright, noted for his experimental and iconoclastic narrative style.

Early life 
Vaid was born in Dinga, in what is now Pakistan.  He and his family moved as refugees during the 1947 partition of the Indian subcontinent, which resulted in the creation of both modern India and Pakistan.  Vaid studied at Punjab University and obtained his doctorate from Harvard University. His dissertation on Henry James was published by Harvard University Press in 1964 called: Technique in the Tales of Henry James.

Career 
He has taught at Indian universities, and moved to the United States in 1966 to continue his academic career.  His literary works have been translated and published in English, French, German, Italian, Polish, Russian, Japanese and several Indian languages. His works include Uska Bachpan (1957) translated into English by Vaid and published as Steps in Darkness,  Bimal Urf Jayen to Jayen Kahan translated into English as Bimal in Bog (1974) and Guzara Hua Zamana (1981) translated into English as The Broken Mirror.

Selected short stories in English translation were published as Silence and Other Stories ( Writer's Workshop, 1972), Dying Alone: A novella and Ten Short Stories (Penguin, 1992), and The Sculptor in Exile ( Penguin Books, 2014).

He did the first translation of Samuel Beckett’s plays “Waiting for Godot” and Endgame (play) into Hindi language in 1968.

Personal life 
After retirement as Professor of English from State University of New York, Potsdam, in 1985, Vaid lived in India for over two decades, and continued his literary activities. In 2010, he moved back to the United States, where he  resided.

He was the father of Urvashi Vaid a well-known U.S. based political activist and Jyotsna Vaid an academic based in the United States. He has another daughter Rachna. Vaid was also the grandfather of the performance artist Alok Vaid-Menon.

Works

Novels 

Uska Bachpan .
  Bimal Urf Jayen to Jayen Kahan . 
Nasreen 
 Ek Naukrani Ki Diary
 Dard La Dava 
 Doosra Na Koi 
 Guzara Hua Zamana 
 Kala Kolaj 
 Maya Lok 
 Nar Nari

Short-story collections 

Beech ka Darwaza .
Mera Dushman.
Bodhisatva ki Biwi.
Badchalan Biwiyo ka Dweep.
 Doosra Kinare Se''' 
 Lapata 
 Uske Bayan 
 Vah aur main Khali Kitab Ka jadoo Pravas Ganga 
 Khamoshi 
 Alap  Lila 
 Pita Ki Parchhaiyan 
 Mera Dushman: Sampoorn Kahaniyan Part 1 Raat ki Sair: Sampoorn Kahanian Part 2 Story collections in English translation 

 Silence (Writers Workshop, Calcutta,1972)
 The Sculptor in Exile (Penguin Books, 2014—issue in Modern Classics series)

 Plays Bhookh Aag HaiHamari BoodhiyaPariwar Akhada Savaal aur Swapna 
 Mona Lisa ki Muskaan 
 Kehte hain Jisko Payar 
  Unt ka Ujala Diaries 

 Khvab hai Divane ka  
 Shama har Rang mein 
 Duboya Mujhko Hone Ne 
 Jab Aankh Khul Gayee Interviews 

 Javab Nahin 
 Criticism 
 Shikast Ki Avaaz 
 Criticism in English
 Technique in the Tales of Henry James (Harvard University Press, 1964)

 Novels in English translation Bimal in Bog ( National Publishing House, 1972)The Diary of a Maidservant (Oxford University Press, 2007)
 Dying Alone , novella and ten stories (Penguin Books,1992)
 The Broken Mirror (Penguin Books, 1994,2014—issued in Modern Classics series)) 
 Steps in Darkness'' (Orion Press,1962, Penguin Books, 1995,2014—issued in Modern Classics series)

References

External links
Basic Information
Ashok Vajpayi in Tehelka
Interview
the short story Mera Dushman in [Hindi]
K.B. Vaid talking vividly about living through communal riots in Dinga, W. Punjab, and how this was reflected in his Partition novel, 'The Broken Mirror' 

1927 births
2020 deaths
20th-century Indian dramatists and playwrights
20th-century Indian novelists
20th-century Indian short story writers
Harvard University alumni
Hindi-language writers
Indian diarists